The Brooke and Anna E. Martin House in Canton, Ohio was built in 1911.  It was designed by architect Guy Tilden in Tudor Revival style.  It was listed on the National Register of Historic Places in 1999.

Tilden designed numerous structures in Canton, Ohio, a number of which were nominated together for National Register listing.

References

Houses on the National Register of Historic Places in Ohio
Tudor Revival architecture in Ohio
Houses completed in 1911
Houses in Stark County, Ohio
National Register of Historic Places in Stark County, Ohio
Buildings and structures in Canton, Ohio